Climbing (Spanish: Escalada), for the 2013 Bolivarian Games, took place from 21 November to 25 November 2013.

Medal table

Medalists

References

Events at the 2013 Bolivarian Games
2013
2013 in sport climbing